Nobuhiko (written: 信彦, 延彦, 伸彦 or 宣彦) is a masculine Japanese given name. Notable people with the name include:

 (born 1963), Japanese politician
 (born 1970), Japanese illustrator of children's books
 (1947–2005), Japanese table tennis player
 (born 1936), Japanese businessman
 (born 1973), Japanese baseball player
Nobuhiko Morino, Japanese film composer
 (1938–2020), Japanese film director screenwriter and editor
 (born 1986), Japanese voice actor and singer
 (born 1977), Japanese professional wrestler
 (born 1962), Japanese mixed martial artist and professional wrestler

Japanese masculine given names